Chathuranga Sanjeewa is a Sri Lankan international footballer who plays as a midfielder for Navy in the Sri Lanka Football Premier League.

International career

International goals
Scores and results list Sri Lanka's goal tally first.

References

Sri Lankan footballers
1991 births
Living people
Sri Lanka international footballers
Sri Lanka Navy SC (football) players
Association football midfielders
Sri Lanka Football Premier League players